My Memories of Mexico (Spanish:México de mis recuerdos) is a 1944 Mexican historical musical film directed by Juan Bustillo Oro and starring Fernando Soler, Sofía Álvarez, Joaquín Pardavé, Dolores Camarillo and Salvador Quiroz. The film nostalgically recreates the years of the Porfirio Díaz dictatorship in Mexico.

The film's sets were designed by the art director Luis Moya.

Cast
 Fernando Soler as Don Jesús Flores 
 Sofía Álvarez as Rosario Medina  
 Joaquín Pardavé as Don Susanito Peñafiel y Somellera 
 Luis Aldás as Pablo Flores  
 Antonio R. Frausto as Don Porfirio Díaz  
 Tana as Adelina Roca 
 Virginia Zurí as Doña Carmelita  
 Mimí Derba as Tía Gertrudis  
 Dolores Camarillo as Conchita, portera  
 María Luisa Serrano as Tía Cuquita  
 Conchita Gentil Arcos as Tía Blandina  
 Salvador Quiroz as Coronel Zamudio  
 Ricardo Mutio as Luis G. Urbina  
 José Pidal as Amado Nervo 
 Ernesto Monato as Ernesto Elorduy 
 Manuel Noriega as Pancho, mayordomo  
 Max Langler as Nicolás Zúñiga y Miranda  
 Victoria Argota as Doña Rumalda Moriones  
 Adelina Vehi as Doña Genara Moriones  
 Valentín Asperó 
 Alfredo Varela padre as Amigo de Chucho  
 Alberto Michel
 Roberto Cañedo as Teniente González  
 Lidia Franco as Invitada a fiesta  
 Paco Martínez as Don Manuel  
 Félix Medel as Pregonero 
 Ignacio Peón as Mayordomo del presidente  
 Manuel Pozos as Invitado a boda 
 Alicia Reyna as Lola, criada de Adelina  
 José Ignacio Rocha as Pregonero  
 Humberto Rodríguez as Ramírez  
 Aurora Ruiz as Petra, criada de Rosario  
 Ramón Sánchez as Barrendero  
 María Valdealde as Invitada que aplaude en boda  
 David Valle González as Camarero  
 Aurora Zermeño as Lucía, amiga de Adelina

References

Bibliography 
 Segre, Erica. Intersected Identities: Strategies of Visualisation in Nineteenth- and Twentieth-century Mexican Culture. Berghahn Books, 2007.

External links 
 

1944 films
1940s historical musical films
Mexican historical musical films
1940s Spanish-language films
Films set in the 19th century
Films directed by Juan Bustillo Oro
Cultural depictions of Porfirio Díaz
Mexican black-and-white films
1940s Mexican films